Brett Tabisel (born September 14, 1982) is an American actor. He performed in Big: the musical in 1996 and appeared in the films Strong Island Boys, Returning Mickey Stern, Dirty Deeds, and Frat Brothers of the KVL. He has made guest appearances in the television series Law & Order: Special Victims Unit, Chappelle's Show, Ed, and the web series Red Oaks. He also has provided voices in video games by Rockstar Games such as Bully and Grand Theft Auto V.

Filmography

Film

Television

Video games

References

External links 
 

Place of birth missing (living people)
1982 births
Living people
20th-century American male actors
21st-century American male actors
Theatre World Award winners
American male child actors
American male musical theatre actors
American male stage actors
American male film actors
American male television actors
American male video game actors
American male voice actors
American male web series actors
Male actors from New York City